Agustín de Ugarte y Sarabia (died 6 December 1650) was a Roman Catholic prelate who served as Bishop of Quito (1647–1650), Bishop of Arequipa (1640–1647), Bishop of Santiago de Guatemala (1630–1640), and Bishop of Chiapas (1629–1630).

Biography
On 3 December 1629, Agustín de Ugarte y Sarabia, a native of the Viceroyalty of New Granada, was appointed during the papacy of Pope Urban VIII as Bishop of Chiapas. On 2 December 1630, he was appointed during the papacy of Pope Urban VIII as Bishop of Santiago de Guatemala. On 24 August 1631, he was consecrated bishop by Luis Córdoba Ronquillo, Bishop of Cartagena. On 19 November 1640, he was appointed during the papacy of Pope Urban VIII as Bishop of Arequipa. On 21 October 1647, he was appointed during the papacy of Pope Innocent X as Bishop of Quito. He served as Bishop of Quito until his death on 6 December 1650.

References

External links and additional sources
 (for Chronology of Bishops) 
 (for Chronology of Bishops)  
 (for Chronology of Bishops) 
 (for Chronology of Bishops) 
 (for Chronology of Bishops) 
 (for Chronology of Bishops) 
 (for Chronology of Bishops) 
 (for Chronology of Bishops) 

1650 deaths
Viceroyalty of New Granada people
17th-century Roman Catholic bishops in Guatemala
Bishops appointed by Pope Urban VIII
Bishops appointed by Pope Innocent X
17th-century Roman Catholic bishops in Ecuador
Roman Catholic bishops of Guatemala (pre-1743)
Roman Catholic bishops of Quito
Roman Catholic bishops of Arequipa